Sechenovsky District is an administrative district (raion), one of the forty in Nizhny Novgorod Oblast, Russia. Municipally, it is incorporated as Sechenovsky Municipal District. It is located in the southeast of the oblast. Its administrative center is the rural locality (a selo) of Sechenovo. Population: 15,446 (2010 Census);  The population of Sechenovo accounts for 34.1% of the district's total population.

History

The district was established in 1929 and renamed in 1944 after physiologist Ivan Sechenov.

References

Notes

Sources

Districts of Nizhny Novgorod Oblast
States and territories established in 1929
 
